Elizabeth Macklin (born 1952 in Poughkeepsie, New York) is an American poet.

Life
She read Spanish literature at SUNY Potsdam, and Complutense University of Madrid. In 1974 to 1999, worked at The New Yorker, living in New York City.

She spent a year in Bilbao, Spain, until February 2000.

She works as a translator with The Basque Literature Series. Her work has appeared in The Nation, New England Review, The New Republic, The New Yorker, The New York Times, Paris Review, The Threepenny Review,  and The Yale Review.

Awards
 1990 Ingram Merrill poetry prize
 1993 Guggenheim Fellowship in Poetry 
 1999 Amy Lowell Poetry Travelling Scholarship
 2005 PEN Translation Fund Grant from PEN American Center

Works

Poetry Books

Anthologies
 
 
 The Penguin Book of the Sonnet, ed. Phillis Levin (Penguin Books, 2001)
 The KGB Bar Book of Poems, ed. David Lehman & Star Black (HarperCollins; 2000)
 
 Prayers at 3 A.M., ed. Phil Cousineau (Harper San Francisco; 1995)
 Best American Poetry 1993, ed. Louise Glück and David Lehman (Scribners).

Essays
 "Who Put the Code in the Dagoeneko?" Barrow Street, Fall 2001.

Criticism

Translations

Reviews

In May 2000, The New York Times Deborah Weisgall noted:

References

External links
 Author's website

Complutense University of Madrid alumni
Writers from Poughkeepsie, New York
1952 births
Living people
State University of New York at Potsdam alumni
American women poets
21st-century American women